Peleg (in pausa , "division") is mentioned in the Hebrew Bible as one of the two sons of Eber, an ancestor of the Ishmaelites and the Israelites, according to the Generations of Noah in  and .

In Scriptures 
Peleg's son was Reu, born when Peleg was thirty, and he had other sons and daughters. According to the Hebrew Bible, Peleg lived to the age of 239 years, (up to when Terah was 118). 
  
In the Septuagint and some Christian Bibles derived from it, Peleg is called  and his father is called . His son is called , born when Phaleg was 130 years old, and he had other sons and daughters. According to the Septuagint, Phaleg lived to an age of 339 years. (Septuagint Genesis 11:16-19) Modern translations generally use the names and dating as in the Masoretic Hebrew text. (compare )

"The earth was divided" 

The meaning of the Earth being divided is usually taken to refer to a patriarchal division of the world, or possibly just the Eastern Hemisphere, into allotted portions among the three sons of Noah for future occupation, as specifically described in the Book of Jubilees, Biblical Antiquities of Philo, Kitab al-Magall, Flavius Josephus, and numerous other antiquarian and mediaeval sources, even as late as Archbishop Ussher, in his Annals of the World. One account, the Conflict of Adam and Eve with Satan, states that "In the days of Phalek (Peleg), the earth was divided a second time among the three sons of Noah; Shem, Ham and Japheth" – it had been divided once previously among the three sons by Noah himself. 

Some Creationists interpret this verse to refer to the continent of Pangaea being split into the modern continents.

Popularity of the name 
Peleg is a common first name and surname in Israel, also being the root lettering for sailing and a military half-bivouac tent. The meaning of Peleg in English is "brook", a little river.

In popular culture 
Peleg is the name of one of the principal owners of the fictional whaling ship Pequod in Herman Melville's Moby-Dick (1851). The following actors have portrayed this character in film adaptations: 

 Mervyn Johns in Moby Dick (1956)
 Gordon Stanley in the off-Broadway Moby Dick (1986) 

Peleg Peterson (played by Fred Paul) is a character in the silent film Infelice (1915). This film is an adaptation of the 1875 novel of the same name by  Augusta J. Evans.

Dan Peleg (played by Noah Emmerich) is a Mossad trainer in the miniseries The Spy (2019).

References

External links
Jewish Encyclopedia: Peleg is briefly mentioned in the article "Eber"

Book of Genesis people